Jordindian is an Indian sketch comedy and music YouTube channel created by Naser Al Azzeh and Vineeth "Beep" Kumar. The name "Jordindian" is based on the origins of the two creators: Naser is Jordanian, while Vineeth is from India.

In 2018, the duo released the music video ′Smoke Shisha Play FIFA', which is their most popular video with over 19 million views.  Although they have released four subsequent music videos, they have primarily focused on producing comedy sketches which are typically based on youth culture in India or highlighting the differences between their respective cultures. They focus on South Indian culture.

Creators
Naser Al Azzeh is a Jordanian-Indian national who was brought up in India. His father is a Jordanian who studied at MS Ramaiah Institute of Technology where he met his Indian mother. He grew up in Bangalore around Lingarajapuram and Cox Town.
 He is a freelance filmmaker, dancer, and founder of Black Ice Crew, an Indian dance group.

Vineeth "Beep" Kumar is a comedian, TV host, emcee and beat-boxer. He has interviewed Salman Khan, A. R. Rahman, Shah Rukh Khan, Sonu Sood, Boman Irani, Mika Singh

In an interview with Jaby Koay and Achara Kirk in May 2020, Naser and Vineeth described meeting at college in India in 2007. They bonded over their love of Russell Peters, and their friendship developed when they realised they lived in the same neighbourhood. The channel Jordindian was founded in 2016 and their first video was uploaded on 12 January 2017.

They were featured in YouTube Rewind 2018.

Discography

References

External links
Jordindian channel on YouTube
Jordindian Instagram

Comedy-related YouTube channels
Indian people of Arab descent